Senné may refer to two villages in Slovakia:
 Senné, Michalovce District
 Senné, Veľký Krtíš District